Qatar competed at the 2019 World Athletics Championships in Doha, Qatar from 27 September to 6 October 2019. The country finished in 16th place in the medal table.

Medalists

Results
(q – qualified, NM – no mark, SB – season best)

Men

Track and road events

Field events

Women

Track and road events

References

External links
Doha｜WCH 19｜World Athletics

Qatar
World Championships in Athletics
2019